Svetlana Şepelev-Tcaci (born 10 May 1969, in Ciolacu Nou, Făleşti) is a former Moldovan long-distance runner.

She competed for her country at the 2004 Summer Olympics in Athens, Greece, where she finished in 61st position in the marathon.

Achievements
All results regarding marathon, unless stated otherwise

References

External links
 
 Sports-reference.com

1969 births
Living people
People from Fălești District
Moldovan female marathon runners
Athletes (track and field) at the 2004 Summer Olympics
Olympic athletes of Moldova